Dessie (also spelled Dese or Dessye) is a town in north-central Ethiopia. Dessie is 400 km to the north of the capital Addis Ababa. It has a population of more than 200,000 people in over 30 wards.

History

Medieval history 
Prior to Dessie's foundation, the major settlement in this area was Wasal, mentioned in an early 16th-century Italian itinerary. Wasel is mentioned as a place that dismembered pieces of the Adal Sultanate's Badlay ibn Sa'ad ad-Din were sent after his defeat in battle.

19th century 
Dessie was founded by Imam Mohammed Ali, later renamed his name as King Michael during the reign of Emperor Yohannes IV who was camping in the highlands to the west of the Chefa Valley in 1882 on an expedition to forcefully convert the Muslims who lived in the region to Christianity. Yohannis who is a Tigray decent was also killed above 30,000 Muslims in Dessie suburb called “Boru Meda”. As he was looking for a place to centralize his power in Wollo, he stayed overnight in a pre-existing town that is now contained within Dessie. While there, he spotted a comet. He was so impressed by the sight of it that he interpreted it to be a sign from heaven to found his capital city there. A similar story to Zara Yaqob's founding of his capital, Debre Birhan. Thus, he named it Dessie (Amharic: "My Joy"), as a reference to the elation that the comet had made him feel.

20th century 
Dessie's location led to the telegraph line constructed between 1902 and 1904 from Asmara south to Addis Ababa, passing through the city, and giving it a local telegraph office. Also in 1904, the Italian Giuseppe Bonaiuti took part in constructing a fair-weather road connecting the city to Addis Ababa.

Dessie increased in importance when Ras Mikael, son-in-law to Emperor Menelik II, made it his base. The city was where his son, would-be emperor Lij Iyasus, crowned Mikael negus around 1915. During his residence in Dessie, the Negus built a palace and the church Enda Medhane Alem. The church is decorated with paintings which include portraits of Ras Mikael and his son.

After the defeat of his father Negus Mikael, Lij Iyasu took refuge in Dessie beginning on 8 November 1916 while unsuccessfully seeking support from Ras Wolde Giyorgis and other major nobles of northern Ethiopia. However, Ras Wolde Giyorgis used these overtures to extract concessions from the central government, then marched on Dessie which Lij Iyasu fled 10 December.

During the Italian invasion, Dessie was first bombed 6 December 1935; the American Hospital was one of the buildings damaged in the attack. Emperor Haile Selassie was photographed personally machine-gunning the raiding planes. The city was occupied by the Italians 15 April 1936.

Dessie became an important administrative center under the Italian occupation, and the Franciscans established, in 1937, the Latin Catholic missionary Apostolic Prefecture of Dessié, which would be suppressed in 1957 after its only prefect's death.

The Italian garrison of the city surrendered 26 April 1941 to Brigadier Pienaar's 1st South African Brigade and 500 Ethiopian arbegnoch, and after the Second World War, the town continued in importance as the capital of the province of Wollo until the province's abolition in 1995.

In a decree of 1942, Dessie is listed as one of only six "Schedule A" municipalities in Ethiopia, while there were about a hundred in "Schedule B". Artist Essaye Gebre-Medhin Fikre was born in Dessie in 1949. He gained a B.A. in Addis Ababa and an M.A. in Paris but was self-taught as an artist. In 1955, a public address system was installed in the central square which was used to re-broadcast announcements on Radio Addis Ababa to the public. In 1957, Dessie had one of 9 provincial secondary schools (excluding Eritrea) in Ethiopia, named after Woizero Sehine the daughter of Negus Mikael.

In February 1973, a crowd of 1,500 peasants marched from Dessie to the capital to make the authorities notice the famine in Wollo. They were stopped by police on the outskirts of Addis Ababa and forced to return. Following the Ethiopian revolution, one of the few major encounters between rebels and government forces took place north-west of Dessie in October 1976. Instigated by the local landlord, a large group of peasants marched on the city; troops of the Derg fired into the crowd. Reports of the death toll vary widely, from several hundred to nearly a thousand. The EPRDF took permanent control of the city on 18 May 1990, as part of Operation Wallelign.

21st century
On 30 October 2021 it was reported that Dessie fell to TPLF aligned forces. On December 6th 2021, the Ethiopian government announced that Dessie and Kombolcha had been liberated from the rebel fighters.

Demographics 
Based on the 2007 national census conducted by the Central Statistical Agency of Ethiopia (CSA), Dessie woreda had a total population of 151,174, of whom 72,932 were men and 78,242 were women; 120,095 people or 79.44% were urban inhabitants living in the town of Dessie, while the rest of the population (31,079 people) were in the rural kebeles around Dessie. For religion, 58.62% of inhabitants indicated Islam, 39.92% indicated Ethiopian Orthodox Christianity.

The 1994 national census reported a total population for Dessie of 97,314 in 20,628 households residing in 17,426 housing units, of whom 45,337 were men and 51,977 were women. The two largest ethnic groups reported in this town were the Amhara (92.83%), and the Tigrayan (4.49%); all other ethnic groups made up 2.68% of the population. Amharic was spoken as a first language by 94.89%, and 3.79% spoke Tigrinya; the remaining 0.67% spoke all other primary languages reported. For religion, 60.42% of inhabitants indicated Ethiopian Orthodox Christianity, and 38.5% indicated Islam.

Climate
Dessie has a subtropical highland climate (Cwb). More to the east, there is a hot semi-arid climate (Bsh).

Economy 
Dessie is located along Ethiopian Highway 2. It has postal service (a post office was established in the 1920s), and telephone service from at least as early as 1954. The city has had electrical power since at least 1963 when a new diesel-powered electric power station with a power line to Kombolcha was completed, at a cost of Eth$ 110,000. Intercity bus service is provided by the Selam Bus Line Share Company. Dessie shares Combolcha Airport (ICAO code HADC, IATA DSE) with neighbouring Kombolcha.

Cityscape 
Dessie is home to a museum, in the former home of Dejazmach Yoseph Birru. It also has a zawiya of the Qadiriyya order of Islam, which was the first Sufi order to be introduced into north-east Africa.

Culture 
Dessie is a part of the Wello region, thus having a similar style of cultural clothing, music, and dances to other cities in the former Wollo Province. Men's traditional clothing is, mostly, similar to the rest of the Amhara region's. Women's traditional clothing includes a habesha kemis, which is a dress, as well as a matching scarf, sometimes two, one tied around the waist and the other over the hair.

Notable locals 
 Mohammed Al Amoudi, Saudi businessman who has been one of the world's richest people of African or Saudi descent

References

External links

Districts of Amhara Region
Ethiopia
Cities and towns in Ethiopia